Wonder Wheel is a 2017 American period drama film written and directed by Woody Allen and starring  Kate Winslet, Jim Belushi, Juno Temple, and Justin Timberlake. Set in the early 1950s at an amusement park on Coney Island, the film takes its title from the park's Ferris wheel. The story follows the second wife and the estranged daughter of a carousel operator as they both pursue affairs with a lifeguard.

The film served as the closing night selection at the 55th New York Film Festival on October 14, 2017, and was released on December 1, 2017, by Amazon Studios. The film received mixed reviews, but with praise for Kate Winslet's performance and the cinematography.

Plot
Mickey Rubin, a Coney Island lifeguard who aspires to be a playwright like Eugene O'Neill, narrates through the fourth wall. Carolina, the daughter of Humpty Rannell, arrives at the boardwalk looking for Ginny Rannell, her father's second wife who works as a waitress at the clam shack. She begs Ginny to let her live with them, but Ginny leaves it up to Humpty, who angrily kicked her out when she married her mobster boyfriend Frank and threw away her college education and chance for a better life. Carolina tells him she is on the run from Frank, who she believes wants to kill her because she gave evidence of mob activity to the FBI. Humpty lets her stay on the condition that she save money to return to college and better her life. Ginny gets her a waitressing job where she works. Soon, Mobsters Angelo and Nick come around, asking Humpty and Ginny for Carolina, but they deny having seen her and the mobsters leave.

Ginny used to be an actress and was happily married, but her infidelity caused her husband to divorce her. She and Humpty are raising her young son Ritchie, a troubled boy who habitually gets into trouble by setting fires. She is unhappy with Humpty and life on the boardwalk, and begins carrying on an affair with Mickey. Humpty is an angry and loud recovering alcoholic who runs the carousel and goes fishing with his friends to bring home dinner. He finds joy and patience for life with Carolina around, and he pays for her to attend night school.

Mickey is attracted to Ginny's maturity and experience, and views her as a somebody in need of saving. He and Carolina accidentally meet some time later, and he becomes attracted by Carolina's story. He thinks he is in love with her, but is conflicted about his feelings for Ginny. Ginny steals money from Humpty to buy Mickey an expensive watch as a birthday present, which he refuses to accept. By this time, Ginny has become suspicious of Mickey's feelings for Carolina and is jealous.

Mobsters Angelo and Nick come around again, asking the owner of the clam shack about Carolina's whereabouts. Carolina takes Mickey on a date to a Brooklyn pizza parlor, and her boss innocently tells this to Angelo and Nick. Ginny telephones the pizza parlor to warn Carolina but begins to stammer, realizing her opportunity to take Carolina away from Mickey, and hangs up. Mickey tells Carolina the truth about his feelings for her and his affair. Instantly feeling compassion for everyone involved, Carolina walks home alone to process the information and decide what to do, not wanting to hurt Ginny or her father or Mickey. We see Angelo and Nick's car following her as she leaves the pizza parlor.

When Carolina does not come home, Humpty asks Mickey the next day if he saw her after the date. Mickey investigates and learns Ginny called the pizza parlor but did not speak. Piecing it together, he confronts Ginny, who has started drinking and getting made up in one of her glamorous stage costumes. She pulls a knife out of the drawer and asks Mickey to kill her, but he leaves. Humpty comes back, sinking back into alcoholism after the police find no trace of Carolina, and tells Ginny he needs her help again to function in life. He tries to find a positive outlook and invites her to meet his friends' wives on a fishing trip, but she coldly refuses, keeping their life in its rut.

Cast

Production

Casting
Kate Winslet was the first actor who came on board for the film, in July 2016, followed by Juno Temple and Jim Belushi. Describing the casting process, Allen said, "The first person I cast was Kate Winslet, then I cast a young girl named Juno Temple who I thought very much of," and "I cast Jim Belushi who I thought was absolutely perfect for it." Talking about the film, Winslet – who was previously attached to Allen's 2005 drama film Match Point but left the project to spend more time with her family – said, "I play the lead. My character is called Ginny, and she's a waitress in a clam house ... It was probably like the second most stressful part I've ever played, but the experience itself was just utterly incredible."

Allen later signed Justin Timberlake in the role of a lifeguard, saying that "I was doing this film and I thought, who could I get that would be an interesting guy to play a lifeguard in about 1950? I was sitting and talking with my brain trust. Someone said, 'What about Justin Timberlake?'" On August 19, 2016, Tony Sirico joined the cast. In September 2016, Jack Gore, Steve Schirripa, and Max Casella rounded out the cast of the film.

Filming
Principal photography began in Coney Island on September 15, 2016. On the same day, filming took place at Vinegar Hill, Brooklyn around Hudson Avenue and Gold Street.

Release
The film premiered as the closing film of the New York Film Festival on October 14, 2017. It was theatrically released on December 1, 2017, on Allen's 82nd birthday.

Wonder Wheel was then released on DVD in the UK by Warner Bros. Home Entertainment on July 16, 2018.

Reception

Box office
Wonder Wheel grossed $1.4 million in the United States and Canada, and $14.5 million in other territories, for a worldwide total of $15.9 million.

In the United States the film made $125,570 from five theaters in its opening weekend (an average of $25,114), marking a 61% drop from Café Societys debut the previous year.

In France, the film was released on January 31, 2018, and sold 20,147 tickets on its opening day, marking the lowest of any Allen film in over 15 years.

Critical response
On review aggregator Rotten Tomatoes, the film has an approval rating of 31% based on 202 reviews, with an average rating of 5/10. The website's critical consensus reads, "Wonder Wheel gathers a charming cast in an inviting period setting, but they aren't enough to consistently breathe life into a Woody Allen project that never quite comes together." On Metacritic, the film has a weighted average score of 45 out of 100, based on 40 critics, indicating "mixed or average reviews".

Manohla Dargis of The New York Times disliked Allen's writing but credited Winslet for filling her "shabby character with feverish life".

Graham Fuller for Screen International wrote a positive review, praising Allen, "It would be going too far to say Wonder Wheel is an instant Woody Allen classic, but it’s a reminder that he’s still a force to be reckoned with."

Peter Travers of Rolling Stone gave Wonder Wheel three out of four stars, and lauded Winslet's performance, writing "there are valid criticisms of Wonder Wheel as a film that feels more like a stage play – its claustrophobic atmosphere can be stifling. But even covering familiar ground, Allen finds the blunt truth at its core. As Ginny is stripped of her fantasies and exposed to the harsh glare of reality, Winslet stands her ground, as if to say attention must be paid. It should be. Her performance is absolutely astounding."

Writing for Entertainment Weekly, Chris Nash found the film to be relatively weak, giving it a C− rating and stating, "Coney Island has never looked more gorgeously golden-hued (thanks to cinematographer Vittorio Storaro), but Allen has seldom been less sharp."

Accolades

References

External links
 
 
 

2017 films
2017 crime drama films
2017 romantic drama films
2010s English-language films
Amazon Studios films
American crime drama films
American romantic drama films
Films about adultery in the United States
Films about lifeguards
Films directed by Woody Allen
Films produced by Letty Aronson
Films produced by Stephen Tenenbaum
Films set in the 1950s
Films set in Brooklyn
Films set in Coney Island
Films set in New York City
Films shot in New York City
Films with screenplays by Woody Allen
2010s American films